The 2015–16 Burundi Ligue A season, also known as Primus Ligue for sponsorship reasons, was the 53rd edition of the top flight football competition in Burundi. The season began on 12 September 2015 and concluded on 12 May 2016. Vital'O successfully defended their title, winning their second consecutive league title and twentieth overall.

Teams 
A total of sixteen clubs participate in this season. Thirteen teams from previous season and three new promoted sides.

Promoted from Ligue B
 Les Crocos
 Olympic Muremera
 Les Eléphants

Relegated from Ligue A
 Prince Louis
 Volontaires
 Académie Tchité

 Other changes
 Aigle Noir Makamba bought the place of Rusizi FC.

 Les Jeunes Athlétiques bought the place of Royal de Muramvya.

Stadiums and locations

League table

References

Burundi Premier League seasons
Premier League
Premier League
Burundi